SAGU American Indian College (SAGU AIC) is a private Christian college in Phoenix, Arizona. It was originally founded in 1957 by missionary Alta Washburn who saw the great need to prepare Native Americans for church ministry. SAGU AIC educates students from about 25 tribes but welcomes students of all ethnicities. It is a regional Assemblies of God college. Until late 2015 the college was accredited by the North Central Association of Colleges and Schools but is now an approved campus of Southwestern Assemblies of God University and accredited by the Southern Association of Colleges and Schools Commission on Colleges (SACSCOC).

History
SAGU AIC was established in 1957 as a Bible institute. Over years of Pentecostal ministry, it has changed location three times and has grown into a regionally accredited college offering multiple degree programs. In September 2007, to commemorate the fiftieth anniversary of the college's establishment, SAGU AIC began a new "Jubilee Walkway" connecting the parking lot with the Henson Memorial Chapel. In 2016, AIC partnered with Southwestern Assemblies of God University (SAGU), Waxahachie, Texas, becoming SAGU AIC.

Academics
SAGU AIC offers several on-campus degree programs: Associate in Arts, Associate in Science, Bachelor of Arts, and Bachelor of Science. The academic department chairs for each major hold an earned doctorate, and all full-time faculty hold at least a master's degree in their field.

SAGU AIC offers its students several opportunities for ministry: Semester outreach programs are offered throughout Arizona, California, and New Mexico; there is an annual four-day trip to Mexico; there are summer ministry traveling teams throughout the country and also abroad; and finally there are also local church opportunities. The Assemblies of God Theological Seminary holds seminars on the SAGU AIC campus for students working towards a master's degree in Christian Ministry.

Campus
The campus centers around the Alta Washburn multi-purpose building, built in 1972, which houses the Dorothy L. Cummings Library and the John McPherson Education Center. The Henson Memorial Chapel, finished in 1978, is an arrowhead-shaped building that houses both a chapel and the offices of the president, dean of students, and director of student services. Most classes take place in the Lee Academic Center. Other notable buildings include the Charles W.H. Scott Student Center, the Rodger Cree Student Union, the Washburn and Gannon Dormitories, and the Ramsey Cafeteria.

Student life
All SAGU AIC students are required to participate in religious activities regularly. The college requires attendance at all chapel services and weekly dormitory devotions. SAGU AIC encourages students to be fully committed Christians in all aspects of life. Student organizations include the Associated Student Body.

Athletics
SAGU AIC has women's and men's basketball teams. There is a gymnasium on campus where students can participate in athletic activities or practice.

References

External links
 

1957 establishments in Arizona
Educational institutions established in 1957
Native American organizations
Universities and colleges affiliated with the Assemblies of God
Private universities and colleges in Arizona
Universities and colleges in Phoenix, Arizona